The Huangshan Cup was a professional non-ranking snooker tournament that took place on only one occasion between 14 and 18 May 2008 in Hefei, China.

The competition was originally planned so that four top-16 ranked players from the UK would play four Chinese players who would come through an elimination contest. Of those originally invited only Stephen Hendry took part, although four top-16 players did reach the quarter-finals along with local players.

Ali Carter, who was a last-minute replacement for Ronnie O'Sullivan, won in the final 5–3 against Marco Fu. The 2008 Sichuan earthquake caused disruption to the event with players withdrawing; Ding Junhui donated his prize money to the earthquake disaster fund.

Main draw

References

Snooker non-ranking competitions
Huangshan Cup
2008 in snooker
2008 in Chinese sport
Snooker competitions in China